The following is a list of notable events and releases of the year 1936 in Norwegian music.

Events

Deaths

 April
 8 – Alfred Paulsen, composer (born 1849).

 December
 8 – Jakob Hveding Sletten, priest and musician (born 1872).
 24 – Paul Knutsen Barstad Sandvik, organist and teacher (born 1847).

Births

 May
 11 – Kåre Kolberg, composer, organist and music critic (died 2014).

 September
 17 – Rolv Wesenlund, comedian, singer, clarinetist, writer and actor (died 2013).

 August
 1 – Helge Hurum, jazz musician, composer, arranger and musical director.

 October
 25 – Alf Cranner, folk singer, lyricist and painter.

 December
 14 – Arve Tellefsen, violinist.

See also
 1936 in Norway
 Music of Norway

References

 
Norwegian music
Norwegian
Music
1930s in Norwegian music